The 2006 Pan American Cycling Championships took place at the Caleirasen Velodrome, São Paulo, Brazil,  June 4–11, 2006. Cuba led the championship with twelve medals.

Medal summary

Road

Men

Women

Under 23 Men

Track

Men

Women

References

Americas
Americas
Cycling
Pan American Road and Track Championships
International cycle races hosted by Brazil
June 2006 sports events in South America